Shangsi may refer to:

Shangsi County, in Guangxi, China
Shangsi Festival, ancient tradition in China